Marconiplein is an underground subway station in the Dutch city of Rotterdam, and is part of Rotterdam Metro lines A, B, and C. The station is part of the two station long extension of the East-West Line (also formerly called Caland line) and opened on 25 April 1986. This extension connected the new Marconiplein and Delfshaven stations with the line's former terminus Coolhaven.

Until 4 November 2002 Marconiplein station was the western terminus of the East-West Line. On that date, an extension towards Schiedam Centrum and Tussenwater stations opened.

References

External links

Rotterdam Metro stations
Railway stations opened in 1986
1986 establishments in the Netherlands
Railway stations in the Netherlands opened in the 20th century